Bidini is a surname. Notable people with the surname include:

Dave Bidini (born 1963), Canadian musician and writer
Fabio Bidini (born 1968), Italian pianist